The Census (Amendment) Act 2000 (2000 c. 24) and Census (Amendment) (Scotland) Act 2000 (2000 asp 3) are acts of the Parliaments of the United Kingdom and Scotland, respectively. They introduced a question on the religion of respondents to the censuses of Great Britain.

Motivation
The inclusion of a question on religion was recommended in a white paper of March 1999. Parliament has indicated that inclusion of a question on religion was to provide useful demographics information for six key areas, namely "discrimination and racial disadvantage, social exclusion, health and community care planning, religious education in schools, regeneration of the inner cities, and helping voluntary sector religious groups".

Legislation

England and Wales
The Parliament of the United Kingdom enacted the Census (Amendment) Act 2000 in order to provide for the asking of a question on religion in the census of England and Wales. Amendments were made to the original Bill by the House of Lords so that no person was to be subject to a penalty for refusing or neglecting to provide details in response to such a question.

Scotland
The Scottish Executive brought forward similar legislation, the Census (Amendment) (Scotland) Act 2000. The Bill was originally  introduced by Jim Wallace and passed through the Parliament, receiving Royal Assent on 10 April 2000. which introduced similar provisions for the inclusion of a question on religion in the census of Scotland. The Scottish Act also provided that a person would not be penalised for failing or refusing to declare a religion on the census.

Northern Ireland
A similar amendment to census legislation was not required in Northern Ireland, as the Census Act (Northern Ireland) 1969 already included provisions for the taking of particulars of religion. All censuses in Ireland have included a question on religion since 1861.

See also
Census in the United Kingdom
Religion in the United Kingdom

References

External links

Image of the Act on the UK Parliamentary website

United Kingdom Acts of Parliament 2000
Censuses in the United Kingdom
Acts of the Parliament of the United Kingdom concerning England and Wales